Christopher Crocker may refer to:
 Chris Crocker (born 1987), American Internet celebrity
 Chris Crocker (American football) (born 1980), American football coach and safety
 Christopher Crocker (cricketer) (born 1963), English cricketer